Dexter Calbert Tucker (born 22 September 1979) is an English former professional footballer who played in the Football League as a forward.

References

1979 births
Living people
Sportspeople from Pontefract
English footballers
Association football forwards
Hull City A.F.C. players
Gainsborough Trinity F.C. players
Selby Town F.C. players
English Football League players